Marcia Lou Lucas (née Griffin; born October 4, 1945) is an American film editor and film producer. She is best known for her work editing the Star Wars trilogy (1977-1983) as well as other films by her then-husband George Lucas: THX-1138 (1971) and American Graffiti (1973). She also edited Martin Scorsese's Alice Doesn't Live Here Anymore (1973), Taxi Driver (1976), and New York, New York (1977).

Lucas won the Academy Award for Best Film Editing in 1977 for Star Wars (1977). She was previously nominated for an Academy Award for her film editing on American Graffiti and for a BAFTA Award for Best Editing for her work on Taxi Driver. After a career gap while raising her family, Lucas produced two films in the 1990s.

Early life
Lucas was born in Modesto, California. Her father was an Air Force officer stationed in Stockton, California, during World War II. Her parents divorced when she was two. Her mother, Mae Griffin, relocated the family to North Hollywood, California, to live with her parents. When Marcia's grandfather died, her mother moved to an apartment nearby, and she found work as a clerk at an insurance agency. When she was a teenager, her father reentered her life, but he had remarried and was stationed in Florida. Marcia lived with her stepfamily for two years and moved back to Hollywood. She returned to North Hollywood to finish high school, and enrolled in chemistry courses at Los Angeles City College while working in a mortgage banking firm.

Career

Early work
In 1964, Marcia's then-boyfriend worked for a Hollywood museum and wanted to hire her as a librarian to catalog all the donated movie memorabilia. They sent her to apply for the job at a California State Employment office. Since she had no experience, the Employment office sent her to Sandler Films who needed an apprentice film librarian with no experience. Marcia was eventually promoted up to being an assistant editor by the time she was twenty. She was in a Motion Picture Editors Guild apprenticeship of eight years, leading to becoming a Guild film editor. She edited promotional films and trailers.

In 1967, Verna Fields, one of the few respected female film editors in the industry at that time, asked Sandler Films to send her an assistant editor to help on a United States Information Agency documentary, about Lyndon B. Johnsons 21–23 December 1967 Asia trip, later titled Journey to the Pacific (1968). Fields had also hired University of Southern California students as assistant editors, including George Lucas. The following spring, the newly engaged Marcia moved in with Lucas at his hilltop apartment on Portola Drive in Beverly Hills and returned to editing commercials as George Lucas accompanied Francis Ford Coppola to scout filming locations for The Rain People (1968) at Long Island, New York. When principal photography begun on The Rain People, Lucas simultaneously begun shooting a behind-the-scenes documentary short titled Filmmaker (1968).

Feature film editing
Back in California, Marcia had accepted an offer to work on Medium Cool (1969) when George had recommended her as an assistant editor for Barry Malkin on The Rain People. Fortunately, the shooting schedule for Medium Cool was delayed, which allowed for her to work on both films. Following this assignment, she and George returned to their Portola Drive residence to edit Filmmaker. Shortly after, Coppola had established a multi-picture deal with his production company American Zoetrope and Warner Bros. Their first project was THX 1138 (1971) for which Marcia served as an assistant editor. Reflecting on the film's commercial failure, Marcia stated "I never cared for THX because it left me cold. When the studio didn't like the film, I wasn't surprised. But George just said to me I was stupid and knew nothing. Because I was just a Valley Girl. He was the intellectual."

When principal photography had wrapped on American Graffiti (1973), George had wanted Marcia to edit the film, but Universal Pictures executive Ned Tanen insisted on hiring Verna Fields, who had just finished editing Steven Spielberg's The Sugarland Express (1974). However, Fields worked on the rough cut of the film and then left to resume work on What's Up, Doc? (1972). For the next six months, Marcia edited American Graffiti alongside her husband and sound editor Walter Murch to its contractual runtime of 110 minutes. In 1974, Marcia Lucas and Fields were nominated for the Academy Award for Best Film Editing for their work on American Graffiti.

After American Graffiti was released, Martin Scorsese asked Marcia to edit Alice Doesn't Live Here Anymore (1974), his first studio film. Sandra Weintraub recalled "We knew her, and we liked her, and she was in the union. It was good for her to get away from George and his house. Here she was, a wonderful editor working on her husband's films. I don't think she got taken seriously." As Marcia was editing the film in Los Angeles, George joined her and sequestered himself in a hotel room as he wrote the first draft for Star Wars (1977). In his fourth draft of Star Wars, George originally had written for Obi-Wan Kenobi to survive his lightsaber duel with Darth Vader by retreating through a blast door that would slam shut behind him. However, Marcia suggested to her husband that he should kill off Kenobi and have him act as a spiritual guide to Luke.

Before Star Wars entered post-production, George did not consider that Marcia would work on it as she expected to give birth after editing Taxi Driver (1976), but the pregnancy was unsuccessful. Instead, George hired British union editor John Jympson to cut the film while they were in England. Horrified by the first rough cut, George fired Jympson and replaced him with Marcia. She was tasked to edit the Battle of Yavin sequence, in which she drastically diverted from the originally scripted shot sequence. George estimated that "it took her eight weeks to cut that battle. It was extremely complex, and we had 40,000 feet of dialogue footage of pilots saying this and that. And she had to cull through all that, and put in all the fighting as well." While editing the sequence, she warned George: "If the audience doesn't cheer when Han Solo comes in at the last second in the Millennium Falcon to help Luke when he's being chased by Darth Vader, the picture doesn't work."

As Marcia edited the Death Star assault, Lucas brought in editor Richard Chew to restructure the rough cut. As the workload grew too burdensome, Lucas hired Paul Hirsch as the film's third editor. Shortly after Christmas 1976, Marcia left Star Wars to work on Scorsese's musical drama New York, New York (1977) because Irving Lerner had died before he finished editing the film. At the 50th Academy Awards, Lucas won the 1977 Academy Award for Best Film Editing with Chew and Hirsch.

Following the success of Star Wars, Marcia decided to place her career on hold in order to raise a family. In the meantime, she supervised the completion of the interior design and decoration of Skywalker Ranch. After viewing the rough cut of Raiders of the Lost Ark (1981), she stated that there was no emotional closure because Marion did not appear at the ending. As a result, Spielberg shot the final scene with her and Indiana Jones. In 1982, Marcia came on board Return of the Jedi as the film's third editor alongside Duwayne Dunham and Sean Barton. When asked of her contributions to the film, George described the scenes in which she helped edit as the emotional "dying and crying" scenes. Marcia's last film credit was as producer of 1996's No Easy Way.

Personal life and legacy
In 1967, Marcia met George Lucas while he was attending film school at the University of Southern California, when they both served as apprentice editors on Journey to the Pacific under Verna Fields. On February 22, 1969, they were married. They adopted one daughter, Amanda Lucas, who was born in 1981. Due to her husband's commitments to the Star Wars films and Raiders of the Lost Ark, Marcia grew impatient in her marriage as she blamed his workaholism and emotional blockage. In mid-1982, she asked for a divorce, but in order to maintain a positive public image, George asked her to wait until after the release of Return of the Jedi to go public with the decision. On June 13, 1983, George formally announced at Skywalker Ranch that he and Marcia were divorcing; the couple would share custody of their daughter while Marcia would relocate to Los Angeles. When the divorce was finalized, she reportedly received $50 million from the settlement.

Marcia later married Tom Rodrigues, a stained glass artist who worked as a production manager at Skywalker Ranch from 1980 to 1983, whom she met before divorcing George. In 1985, the couple had a daughter, Amy Rodrigues. Lucas and Rodrigues divorced in 1993.

In an interview, Mark Hamill cited Marcia for her contributions to Star Wars. In Mythmaker: The Life and Work of George Lucas, filmmaker John Milius described Marcia's contributions to Milius's own films and those of George Lucas, Steven Spielberg, and Martin Scorsese, calling her one of the best editors he knew. In 2021, SFGate published an article calling Marcia the "secret weapon of 'Star Wars'", further stating that: "Considering the reaction to the 'Star Wars' prequels and George's distance from the franchise now, it's not a stretch to say that Marcia was actually the glue that kept the galaxy far, far away together. Or, at the very least, helped repair it when it needed to be fixed." Some have called George the "head" of Star Wars and Marcia the "heart", though Marcia commented, "I wouldn't think so. I definitely made scenes work. I made the end battle work, I definitely had a lot to do with making it work, but I wasn't the writer and I wasn't the director, and I didn't come up with the creative names, Darth Vader, Luke Skywalker. All those names are classics. George came up with all of it using his amazing imagination."

In J. W. Rinzler's posthumous final book, Howard Kazanjian: A Producer's Life, Lucas criticized the later Star Wars films. She revealed that upon seeing The Phantom Menace, she "cried because [she] didn't think it was very good," particularly criticizing the age gap between romantic leads Anakin Skywalker and Padmé Amidala. On the sequel trilogy, she stated that Kathleen Kennedy and J. J. Abrams "don't get it", saying she was furious at the deaths of Han Solo and Luke Skywalker, as well as the lack of an explanation for Rey's powers.

Filmography

Work as a producer
No Easy Way (1996) - executive producer
A Good Son (1998) - producer; short film

Special thanks credit for
More American Graffiti (1979)
The Making of 'Raiders of the Lost Ark''' (1981, television documentary film)Twice Upon a Time (1983, ''extra special thanks'')A Good Son'' (1998, short; ''made possible by a grant from'')

Awards and nominations

References

Sources

Easy Riders, Raging Bulls

Excerpt of the first 100 pages

External links 

1945 births
American film editors
American women film editors
Best Film Editing Academy Award winners
Living people
Los Angeles City College alumni
People from Modesto, California
People from North Hollywood, Los Angeles
21st-century American women